The following is a timeline of the history of the city of Mombasa, Coast Province, Kenya.

14th-18th centuries

 1331 - Ibn Battuta, a Moroccan traveler, visits Mombasa.
 1498 - 8 April: Vasco da Gama anchors in port.
 1505 - Town sacked by Portuguese forces of Francisco de Almeida.
 1507 - Mandhry Mosque built.
 1528 - Town sacked by Portuguese forces of Nuno da Cunha.
 1529 - Portuguese in power.
 1588 - Town captured by Amir Ali Bey.
 1593 - Town under rule of Malindi.
 1594 - Fort Jesus built by Portuguese.
 1597 - Augustinian mission initiated.
 1631 - Portuguese "expelled."  The sultan of Mombasa, christened Dom Jerónimo Chingulia, assassinated the Portuguese governor, reclaimed his Muslim name of Yusuf ibn al-Hasan, and ordered all Christians in the city to convert to Islam.
 1632 - Town besieged by Portuguese forces.
 1635 - Fort Jesus repaired by Francisco de Seixas e Cabreira.
 1661 - Town sacked by Omani forces.
 1696 - Siege of Fort Jesus by Omani forces.
 1698 - Sultanate of Oman in power.
 1728/9 - A Portuguese force from Goa again held Mombasa, but were driven out by the Muscat Arabs.
 1734 - Mazrui in power.

19th century
 1837 - Said bin Sultan, Sultan of Muscat and Oman in power.
 1875 - A revolt against Zanzibar was put down with British assistance.
 1885 - Hinduism in Africa Formation of the Hindu Union, and creation of Lord Shiva Temple (Shivaalay) in Central Mombasa.
 1887 - Mombasa "leased to the British East Africa Company;" town becomes capital of British East Africa Protectorate.
 1895 - Government Press established.
 1896
Kilindini Harbour inaugurated.
 National Bank of India branch and Mombasa Club established.
 1897 - Population on island: 15,000-20,000 (estimate).
 1899 - Post office built.

20th century
 1901
 Uganda Railway (Kisumu-Mombasa) begins operating.
 African Standard newspaper begins publication.
 Jevanjee mosque built.
 1902 - Court of Kenya established.
 1903 - Seif Bin Salim public library founded.
 1904 - Africa Hotel in business.
 1905
 Mombasa Cathedral opens.
 Court of Kenya relocated from Mombasa to Nairobi.
 1907 - Slavery abolished.
 1910 - Population: about 30,000.
 1920 - Town becomes part of British Protectorate of Kenya.
 1927 - Kenya Daily Mail newspaper begins publication.
 1929 - Makupa Causeway built.
 1931 - Nyali Bridge built.
 1937 - Likoni Ferry begins operating.
 1944 - Aga Khan Hospital, Mombasa established.
 1951 - Mombasa Institute of Muslim Education opens.
 1955 - Roman Catholic Diocese of Mombasa and Zanzibar established.
 1958 - Oceanic Hotel built.
 1962 - Population: 179,575 urban agglomeration.
1962 - 1963 David Kayanda becomes the first African Mayor of Mombasa.
 Msanifu Kombo becomes mayor.
 Town becomes part of Republic of Kenya.
 1973
 27 April: MV Globe Star ship runs aground near Mombasa.
 Population: 301,000 urban agglomeration.
 1979 - Moi International Airport expanded.
 1980 - New Nyali Bridge built.
 1981
 Mombasa Records Centre of the Kenya National Archives established.
 Sister city relationship established with Seattle, US.
 1984 - New Burhani Mosque built.
 1985 - Mombasa Marathon begins.
 1986 - Marine Park established.
 1990 - Population: 476,000 (urban agglomeration).
 1998 - Najib Balala becomes mayor.
 1999
 Mombasa Republican Council formed.
 Coast Gymkhana Club Ground in use.
 2000 - Population: 687,000 (urban agglomeration).

21st century

 2002 - 28 November: 2002 Mombasa attacks.
 2003 - Aga Khan Academy, Mombasa established in Kilindini.
 2005 - Population: 830,000 (urban agglomeration).
 2007 - Mombasa Polytechnic University College established.
 2009
 Ahmed Mohdhar elected mayor.
 Population: 523,183.
 2010 - Population: 905,627 (estimate).
 2012
 15 May: Grenade attack in Bella Vista nightclub.
 27 August: Cleric Aboud Rogo killed; unrest ensues.
 2013
 October: Cleric Sheikh Ibrahim killed; unrest ensues.
 Mombasa polytechnic university college was promoted to a fully developed university now known as Technical University of Mombasa.
 2017 - Mombasa–Nairobi Standard Gauge Railway begins operating.

See also
 Mombasa history (fr)
 Mombasa District
 Timelines of other cities in Kenya: Nairobi

References

Bibliography

Published in 19th century
 
 

Published in 20th century
 
 
 
 
 
 
  
 
 
 
 
 
 
 
 
 
 
 
 
 
 

Published in 21st century

External links

  (Bibliography of open access  articles)
  (Images, etc.)
  (Images, etc.)
  (Images, etc.)
  (Bibliography)
  (Bibliography)
  (Bibliography)
 

Mombasa
Mombasa
Mombasa
mombasa
Years in Kenya